The Manuherikia River is located in Otago in the South Island of New Zealand. It rises in the far north of the Maniototo, with the West Branch draining the eastern side of the St Bathans Range, and the East Branch draining the western flanks of the Hawkdun Range.  The river continues southwest through the wide Manuherikia Valley to its confluence with the Clutha River at Alexandra. During the 1860s the Manuherikia was one of the centres of the Central Otago Gold Rush.

The river is crossed by two historically significant bridges, the curved Manuherikia Bridge No.1 (number 70 on the Otago Central Railway line), a concrete pier bridge completed in 1903, and a stone pier bridge at Ophir built in 1880.

The Māori spelling for the river is Manuherekia, meaning "at long last".

See also

List of rivers of New Zealand

References

External links

Rivers of Otago
Rivers of New Zealand
Tributaries of the Clutha River